Nigel Olsson (born 10 February 1949) is an English rock drummer and singer best known for his long-time affiliation with Elton John. A dynamic drummer and backing vocalist, Olsson helped establish the Elton John sound as a member of the Elton John Band alongside bassist Dee Murray.

When not working with John, Olsson has taken up the role of a session musician. He has also composed, recorded, and produced albums for his own solo career.

Career

Early years
Olsson was born to John and Elsa Olsson in Wallasey, Cheshire, England, the second of five boys. He began his musical career playing the guitar in small bands, and took up the drums at a gig where the drummer did not show up at the last minute. His first appearance on a record album was in the band Plastic Penny, which released Two Sides of a Penny on Page One Records in 1968. Olsson was spotlighted on one song on that album, "I Want You," performing both lead vocals and a drum solo. In 1969 he played drums on the "flower power" pop single "Mr. Boyd" b/w "Imagine" by Argosy, a one-off group which also included Reginald Dwight (later known as Elton John), Caleb Quaye, and Roger Hodgson. Olsson also had a brief stint with the English hard rock band Uriah Heep, playing drums on two songs on their 1970 debut LP, Very 'eavy... Very 'umble. Subsequently, he played drums on one track on Elton John's debut album, Empty Sky, and then replaced Dave Hynes in The Spencer Davis Group, joining forces with bassist Dee Murray. The pair joined John on the road as his touring band in April 1970, and played with John during his debut tour in the United States at the Troubadour Club on 25 August 1970. Only permitted at first to play on one track of each of John's early studio albums, Olsson and Murray, along with guitarist Davey Johnstone, became Elton's studio band with the recording of Honky Chateau in January 1972.

Joining the Elton John band

With Johnstone, Olsson, and Murray on board, John enjoyed a string of critically acclaimed albums and hit singles. The albums include Honky Chateau, Don't Shoot Me I'm Only the Piano Player, Goodbye Yellow Brick Road, and Caribou. Shortly before the Caribou studio sessions, famed session percussionist Ray Cooper joined permanently, having previously been a sideman, what was billed as The Elton John Band. Olsson played during all of John's tours, and confesses that he still gets nervous before going on stage.

In 1971, Olsson produced and released his debut solo album Nigel Olsson's Drum Orchestra and Chorus on Uni Records, featuring Murray, Cochise (band) guitarist Mick Grabham, and Hookfoot guitarist Caleb Quaye, who had played on John's early albums. Olsson also teamed up with the Liverpool trio, The Big Three, for their reunion album Resurrection (1973).

In May 1975, Olsson and Murray were dismissed from John's band following the release of Captain Fantastic and the Brown Dirt Cowboy, which, upon release, entered the charts at No. 1. Olsson's second solo album, Nigel Olsson, appeared later that year on John's own record label, The Rocket Record Company, and featured a cover of the Bee Gees'-penned "Only One Woman", which had been recorded with John and his band in August 1974 during the sessions for Captain Fantastic and the Brown Dirt Cowboy, and was produced by Gus Dudgeon. The album was produced by Robert Appére.

Olsson continued working as a studio musician, releasing another self-titled album produced by Paul Davis on Columbia in 1978, while managed by Martin Pichinson. Although that album brought no Top 40 recognition, in 1979 he released the album Nigel and enjoyed some mild success as a solo artist, scoring a pair of Top 40 hits on the U.S. pop chart with "A Little Bit of Soap" and "Dancin' Shoes", the latter of which cracked the Top 20 at No. 18. "Dancin' Shoes" was written by Carl Storie, and first recorded by his Faith Band.

In August 1980, he released the album Changing Tides on CBS's Bang Records, but the album failed to achieve chart success. That same year, Olsson returned to Elton John's band for what was to be a four-year tenure, appearing on John's albums 21 at 33 and The Fox. He rejoined former bandmates Murray and Johnstone for the tour behind John's 1982 album Jump Up!, and stayed with the reformed band through the next two albums and tours for Too Low for Zero (1983) and Breaking Hearts (1984). Following another line-up change, they would rejoin only one more time in 1988 for backing vocals on Reg Strikes Back prior to Murray's untimely death on 15 January 1992.

In 1991 Olsson reunited with Johnstone in the band Warpipes, releasing Holes in the Heavens. Although the album was critically successful, it failed commercially when their label, Artful Balance, went bankrupt, and the band was unable to tour to support the record.

On 31 March 2000, Olsson sang backing vocals alongside Billy Trudel and Ken Stacey when John appeared on The Today Show to promote the soundtrack to the film The Road to El Dorado. On 3 April, Olsson played drums on three songs at the Broadway Cares/Equity Fights AIDS benefit saluting John at the New Amsterdam Theatre in New York City. By the time of John's "One Night Only" concerts in New York City on 20 and 21 October, Olsson was alternating with and playing drums alongside Curt Bisquera. In January 2001, Olsson took over the full-time drumming chores when Bisquera left to pursue other projects.

In 2001 Olsson released another solo album entitled Move The Universe on 81 Records. Davey Johnstone and Guy Babylon produced the record and played on all of the tracks, along with Bob Birch on bass, Elton John alumnus Fred Mandel on piano, John Mahon on percussion, and Billy Trudel on backing vocals. Kiki Dee sang lead vocals on Roachford's "Naked Without You", and Olsson's brother Kai sang lead vocals on McGuinness Flint's "When I'm Dead an' Gone."  The track "Building A Bird" had been written by Elton John & Bernie Taupin in 1994 during the sessions for Elton's album "Made in England," but never recorded. Olsson dedicated the album to the late Dee Murray.

In the studio, he played and sang backing vocals on several tracks on John's Songs from the West Coast (2001). He then played all the drums on Peachtree Road (2004) and The Captain & the Kid (2006), as well as continuing in the touring band, along with Johnstone, Bob Birch (bass), Kim Bullard (keyboards) and John Mahon (percussion). With bassist Matt Bissonette replacing the late Bob Birch in 2012, this band recorded Wonderful Crazy Night in 2015 for release in February 2016.

On 9 November 2014, Olsson played his 2000th concert with Elton John at the Ice Hall Palace in Saint Petersburg, Russia.

On his 68th birthday, 10 February 2017, Olsson played his 2,267th concert with Elton John at The Colosseum at Caesars Palace, Las Vegas, Nevada.

Personal life
Olsson has two children: Justin, who lives with his wife Angela in the United States, and Annette, who lives with her husband Barry and children Ashley and Katie in England. He has been married to Schanda Butler since 25 June 1989, and resides in Los Angeles.

Olsson is a longtime car and racing fanatic, and has been associated with the Vintage Auto Racing Association and the Historic Motor Sports Association in the United States as both a racing car driver and a pace car driver.

Discography

Albums

Singles

Collaborations 
With Elton John
 Empty Sky (MCA Records, 1969)
 Tumbleweed Connection (Uni Records, 1970)
 Madman Across the Water (Uni Records, 1971)
 Honky Château (Uni Records, 1972)
 Don't Shoot Me I'm Only the Piano Player (MCA Records, 1973)
 Goodbye Yellow Brick Road (MCA Records, 1973)
 Caribou (MCA Records, 1974)
 Captain Fantastic and the Brown Dirt Cowboy (MCA Records, 1975)
 21 at 33 (Rocket, 1980)
 The Fox (Geffen, 1981)
 Too Low for Zero (Geffen, 1983)
 Breaking Hearts (Geffen, 1984)
 Songs from the West Coast (Mercury Records, 2001)
 Peachtree Road (Rocket Records, 2004)
 The Captain & the Kid (Mercury Records, 2006)
 Wonderful Crazy Night (Mercury Records, 2016)

With The Keane Brothers
 The Keane Brothers (20th Century Records, 1977)

With Neil Sedaka
 The Hungry Years (The Rocket Record Company, 1975)
 Steppin' Out (The Rocket Record Company, 1976)
 In the Pocket (Elektra Records, 1980)

With Kenny Rogers
 If Only My Heart Had a Voice (Giant, 1993)

With Eric Carmen
 Boats Against the Current (Arista Records, 1977)
 Change of Heart (Arista Records, 1978)

With Linda Ronstadt
 Prisoner in Disguise (Asylum Records, 1975)

With Roch Voisine
 Kissing Rain (BMG, 1995)

With Jimmy Webb
 Land's End (Asylum Records, 1974)
 El Mirage (Atlantic Records, 1977)

With Cate Brothers
 Cate Bros. (Asylum Records, 1975)

With Lawrence Gowan
 Great Dirty World (Columbia Records, 1987)

With B.B. King
 B.B. King & Friends: 80 (Geffen, 2005)

With Barbi Benton
 Something New (Playboy Records, 1976)

With David Sneddon
 Seven Years – Ten Weeks (Mercury Records, 2003)

With Michel Polnareff
 Michel Polnareff (Atlantic Records, 1975)

With Dalbello
 Lisa Dal Bello (MCA Records, 1977)

With Rod Stewart
 Atlantic Crossing (Warner Bros. Records, 1975)

With Leo Sayer
 Endless Flight (Chrysalis Records, 1976)

With Brian Cadd
 White on White (Capitol Records, 1976)

References

External links
 
 Drummerworld
 

1949 births
Living people
English rock drummers
English male singers
Bang Records artists
Uriah Heep (band) members
People from Wallasey
English people of Swedish descent
Columbia Records artists
Polydor Records artists
English session musicians
Rocket Records artists
English expatriates in the United States
The Spencer Davis Group members
The Big Three (English band) members
Elton John Band members